Delaware's 2nd Senate district is one of 21 districts in the Delaware Senate. It has been represented by Democrat Darius Brown since 2018, succeeding fellow Democrat Margaret Rose Henry. It is the most Democratic-leaning district in the Senate.

Geography
District 2 is based in southern and eastern Wilmington along the Delaware River in New Castle County, also covering Minquadale and parts of New Castle and Edgemoor.

Like all districts in the state, the 2nd Senate district is located entirely within Delaware's at-large congressional district. It overlaps with the 1st, 2nd, 6th, 16th, and 17th districts of the Delaware House of Representatives. The district borders New Jersey.

Recent election results
Delaware Senators are elected to staggered four-year terms. Under normal circumstances, the 2nd district holds elections in midterm years, except immediately after redistricting, when all seats are up for election regardless of usual cycle.

2018

2014

2012

Federal and statewide results in District 2

References 

2
New Castle County, Delaware